Alvyn Antonio Sanches (born 12 February 2003) is a French professional footballer who plays as a winger for Swiss Super League club FC Lausanne-Sport.

Club career
Sanches is a youth product of the academies of Lausanne Benfica and Lausanne-Sport. He signed his first contract with Lausanne-Sport on 13 November 2020. He made his professional debut with Lausanne-Sport in a 5–0 Swiss Super League loss to FC St. Gallen on 15 May 2021.

Personal life
Sanches was born in Créteil, France and is of Cape Verdean descent. He was raised in Switzerland.

References

External links
 
 SFL Profile
 Football.ch Profile

2003 births
Living people
Sportspeople from Créteil
French footballers
Swiss men's footballers
French emigrants to Switzerland
French sportspeople of Cape Verdean descent
Swiss people of Cape Verdean descent
Swiss sportspeople of African descent
FC Lausanne-Sport players
Swiss Super League players
Association football wingers
Footballers from Val-de-Marne